Carlo Calzà (born 7 June 1931) is an Italian speed skater. He competed in two events at the 1956 Winter Olympics.

References

External links
 

1931 births
Living people
Italian male speed skaters
Olympic speed skaters of Italy
Speed skaters at the 1956 Winter Olympics
People from Cortina d'Ampezzo
Sportspeople from the Province of Belluno